El Bonillo is a municipality in Albacete, Castile-La Mancha, Spain. It has a population of 3,280. The historic Church of Santa Catalina stands in the town.

Municipalities of the Province of Albacete